Virgilio Mazzocchi (22 July 1597 bapt. – 3 October 1646) was an Italian baroque composer.

Biography 
He was born in Veja, near Civita Castellana, where he was baptized, as the younger brother of the more famous composer and learned lawyer Domenico Mazzocchi.
 
Like his brother, who shared some features of his career, he was largely a composer of sacred vocal music. Mazzocchi is associated with providing music for the papal chapels.
 
He died in Civita Castellana, where he had gone with his singers to celebrate the holy patrons, after a sudden illness.

Works 
 Chi soffre, speri, in collaboration with Marco Marazzoli - Rome (1637);
 Vespro Della Beata Vergine, vespers for the Holy Virgin.

Recordings 
 Virgilio Mazzocchi, Vespro Della Beata Vergine, Konrad Junghänel (conductor), Concerto Palatino, Cantus Cölln (YouTube).

Sources and References
 Entry under Domenico (and Virgilio) Mazzocchi in the Concise Baker's Biographical Dictionary of Musicians
 Entry under Virgilio Mazzocchi in the Grove Dictionary of Music and Musicians.
 Cardinali A., 1926, Cenni biografici di Domenico e Virgilio Mazzocchi.

External links 
 
 

1597 births
1646 deaths
Italian Baroque composers
Italian male classical composers
17th-century Italian composers
17th-century male musicians